Koziegłowy  is a town in Myszków County, Silesian Voivodeship, Poland, with 2,455 inhabitants (2019).

History
Since its foundation Koziegłowy belonged to Lesser Poland's Kraków Voivodeship, and in 1519 local nobleman named Krystyn IV (Lis coat of arms) sold the village with the castle to Archbishop of Kraków, Jan Konarski. Koziegłowy then became part of the Duchy of Siewierz, which in 1790 was merged with Lesser Poland. On April 27, 1792, Koziegłowy received its town charter from King Stanisław August Poniatowski.

In 1795 the town was annexed by the Kingdom of Prussia (see Partitions of Poland), becoming part of the province of New Silesia. In 1807 it was annexed by the Duchy of Warsaw, which in 1815 became Russian-controlled Congress Poland. Following other Lesser Poland's towns, the Russians stripped Koziegłowy of its charter (1870), reducing it to the status of a village. In 1918 Koziegłowy returned to re-established Poland, and until September 1939 it belonged to Second Polish Republic's Kielce Voivodeship before captured German Wehrmacht. Its Jewish population was decimated in the Holocaust, and on January 20, 1945, the village was is liberated by the Red Army. Koziegłowy again became a town in 1949.

Sights
Among points of interest there is St. Mary church with a 15th-century presbytery and a 1679 nave, and ruins of the 14th-century castle of the Lis family.

Notable People
Aryeh Tzvi Frumer, Rabbi of the town.

References

External links
Jewish Community in Koziegłowy on Virtual Shtetl

Cities and towns in Silesian Voivodeship
Myszków County
Piotrków Governorate
Kielce Voivodeship (1919–1939)
Holocaust locations in Poland